Kjøita or Kjøita Park is a neighbourhood in the city of Kristiansand in Agder county, Norway. It's located along the eastern shore of the Otra river in the borough of Lund. The neighborhood of Oddemarka lies to the east, Gimle lies to the north, and the centre of Lund lies to the southeast. Kjøita Park is an industrial park.

References

Geography of Kristiansand
Neighbourhoods of Kristiansand